This is a list of diplomatic missions in India. There are 153 embassies/high commissions in New Delhi, and many countries maintain consulates in other Indian cities (not including honorary consulates).

Most of these diplomatic missions in Delhi are located in Chanakyapuri diplomatic enclave.

Diplomatic missions in New Delhi

Embassies/High Commissions 

 (Embassy)

 (Embassy)

 (Embassy)

 (Apostolic Nunciature)

 (Embassy)

 (High Commission)

 (High Commission)

 (High Commission)
 (Embassy)

 (Embassy)

 
 (Embassy)

 (Embassy)

 (High Commission)
 (Embassy)

Other missions or delegations 
 (Delegation)
 (Representative Office)
 (Taipei Economic and Cultural Center in India)
UNHCR (Delegation)

Gallery

Consular missions 

Agartala
 (Assistant High Commission)

Ahmedabad

Bengaluru

 (Consulate General) 
 (Consulate General)

Chandigarh

Chennai

 (Deputy High Commission)
 (Consulate General)

 (Consulate General)
 (Consulate General)

 (Consulate General)
 (Deputy High Commission)
 (Economic & Cultural Center) 
 (Consulate General)
 (Deputy High Commission)
 (Consulate General)

Guwahati
 (Assistant High Commission)

Hyderabad

 (Consulate General)

Kolkata
  
 (Deputy High Commission)
 

 

 (Consulate General)

Mumbai

 
 

 

  
 

 
 

 
 
 

 

 
 (Consulate General)

Panaji

Pondicherry

Thiruvananthapuram

Non-resident embassies

Resident in Beijing, China 
 
 

 

 

Resident in Taipei, Taiwan 

 

 

Resident in elsewhere
 (Ankara)
 (Kuwait City)
 (Kuala Lumpur)
 (Riyadh)
 (Tehran)
 (Jerusalem)
 (Hanoi)
 (Kuwait City)
 (Muscat)
 (Baku)
  (Baku)
 (Abu Dhabi)

Closed missions

See also
 Foreign relations of India
 List of diplomatic missions of India
 List of ambassadors and high commissioners of India
 List of ambassadors and high commissioners to India
 Visa policy of India
 Visa requirements for Indian citizens

References 

India
Diplomatic missions
List